Brewster's Millions is a 1935 British musical comedy film directed by Thornton Freeland and starring Jack Buchanan, Lili Damita and Nancy O'Neil. It is based on the 1902 novel and subsequent 1906 play, with the action relocated from the United States to Britain.

Plot

Jack Brewster, a pauper living in London and the heir to a fortune from his wealthy father, falls in love with Cynthia, a boarder in his boarding house "home." When Jack inherits his fortune, which includes £500,000 and the house, he falls prey to chorus girl Rosalie. His uncle then dies, leaving Jack six million pounds, on the condition that he become penniless in the next six months. At his house warming for his first inheritance, Jack learns of the second bequest, which require him not only to lose all his money, but to have no female entanglements and tell no one of its conditions. Jack goes on a wild spending spree, which includes producing a musical stage show starring Rosalie. He then takes the entire cast of the show on a yacht to Monte Carlo, in the hope of losing his money through gambling. Jack has nothing but good luck, however, as the show is a hit and he even wins at the gambling tables. Jack goes so far as to buy some seemingly worthless stock, which only turns out to be worth another fortune. Jack undergoes various indignities, such as being chased by kidnappers through a fiesta, which ends with him winding up as the rear end of a paper mache dragon. Throughout his spending spree, Cynthia becomes more detached and Rosalie more attached. As his "zero hour" approaches, Jack trades away his entire fortune, leaving him with nothing more than the suit he wears, despite the well-meaning attempts of friends to give him money. Finally meeting all the conditions of his uncle's will, Jack attains the £6,000,000, as well as the love of Cynthia.

Cast

Critical reception
The New York Times wrote, "take an inventive young man who is required to spend a quarter of a million dollars in six months, and you possess the germ of a successful farce. If this sounds a trifle uncertain, it is because the new British screen edition of "Brewster's Millions" leaves you with just that rueful impression. Instead of telling the story in the swift and eventful terms of screen comedy, the present gentlemen have used it simply as the libretto for a big, eye-filling musical photoplay in the combustible Hollywood style. There are songs, dances, girls and more girls, and a great fiesta scene featuring a mass dance called la caranga, which seems to be a compound of all the recent variations on the rumba. Although the English ladies of the ensemble are lovely, the tunes quite acceptable and Mr. Jack Buchanan an able and versatile performer, the film never comes off as musical comedy. Those song-and-dance interludes during which Mr. Buchanan abandons his money-spending campaign are useful chiefly to remind the audience that "Brewster's Millions" is still a sufficiently sturdy comedy to stand on its own feet. When the piece is being played straight, it is always bright and amusing in a slightly desperate British style...Mr. Buchanan is an engagingly frantic Brewster and he is assisted pleasantly enough by Lili Damita as the malicious chorus girl who wants to snare him and by Nancy O'Neil as his conservative sweetheart. But "Brewster's Millions" is more hilarious in theory than in practice in this British rendition"; while TV Guide noted, "the witty, energetic Buchanan has a field day with this craftily scripted comedy. The over-produced musical numbers and the elaborate Italian fiesta scenes are delights, as is every scene of this classic example of British wit."

References

External links
 
 

1935 films
British musical comedy films
1935 musical comedy films
Films set in England
Films about inheritances
Films based on American novels
Films directed by Thornton Freeland
British black-and-white films
Films based on Brewster's Millions
British and Dominions Studios films
Films shot at Imperial Studios, Elstree
1930s English-language films
1930s British films